Channel 9, known by its brand name El Nueve (stylized as elnueve) is an Argentine free-to-air television network based in Buenos Aires with programming centred on general entertainment.

History

Origins and first Romay ownership
After the fall of the second government of Juan Perón, the military government of Pedro Eugenio Aramburu opened three new television licenses in Buenos Aires for bidding: channels 9, 11 and 13. The winner for channel 9, which would bear the callsign LS 83 TV, was Compañía Argentina de Televisión, S.A. (CADETE), which began its broadcasts in 1960. Canal 9's stock was partially owned by foreign companies, including the United States' NBC.

In 1963 Alejandro Saúl Romay, who was the owner of Radio Libertad and known as "the czar of TV", became the manager of Canal 9, and in the following years he acquired the stock held by the foreign investors, transforming Canal 9 into the first television network fully funded by Argentine capital. Under his leadership, Canal 9 became competitive in the ratings, fighting for first place with Canal 13 and then Canal 11.

Nationalization
In 1974, during Juan Perón's third term as President of Argentina, Canal 9 was seized by the government along with channels 11 and 13, remaining as a state-owned station throughout the following military regime, this time under Argentine Army administration. It began color broadcasts in 1980.

Romay returns
At the end of military dictatorship, the network was re-privatized in 1983, and Alejandro Romay regained control of the channel in the bidding process, a position he would hold from taking possession of the station on May 25, 1984, until 1997. In the five months between the return to democracy and Romay's taking control of the station, Alfredo Garrido took over as administrator, sowing the seeds for Canal 9's return to the top of the ratings throughout the remainder of the 1980s. Romay's long term as the owner of Canal 9 made him one of the most powerful figures in Argentine media. Following its re-privatization, the station was renamed "Canal 9 Libertad" (Channel 9 Liberty) and a new logo debuted for this purpose. In 1997, new studios were constructed in the Buenos Aires neighborhood of Colegiales.

At its height under Romay, Canal 9 adopted as part of its visual identity a dove near the number 9 logo, which earned the channel the nickname of El canal de la palomita ("The channel of the little dove"). It was replaced with a heart logo in 1995.

1997-2002: Azul Televisión
Australian regional broadcaster Prime Television bought all of Canal 9 in 1997 for US$135 million ($ in  dollars); Prime then onsold half of it for US$74 million. In response to a ratings slump and wanting to tone down Canal 9 from a style that often tended toward the sensational under Romay, a US$20 million ($ in  dollars) rebranding effort was embarked upon, with its largest element a massive rebrand from Canal 9 Libertad to Azul Televisión in January 1999.

However, Prime Television didn't get nearly the return on its investment that it wanted. The timing was exceptionally bad for Prime, as the acquisition and improvements made to Azul coincided with the start of the 1998–2002 Argentine great depression. In late 1999, Azul-related losses sent Prime's net profit plummeting 99% over the previous year and led to the departure of its chief executive. Total losses incurred from the Argentinian business were north of A$50 million (US$25.9 million, $ in  dollars). Amidst these spectacular losses, national economic problems, and ratings that weren't improving, Prime looked to get out, announcing it was selling its interest in Azul in March 1999. In 2001, Prime's foray into Argentina, which had lasted more than three years, ended, to the relief of its shareholders, when it sold its stake to JP Morgan for US$67.5 million ($ in  dollars).

Spain's Telefónica began moving to buy out Azul. Using acquisitions and discussions with the owners of the remaining 50%, Telefónica grew its stake in the network. in 1999, but its preexisting ownership of ratings leader Telefe (channel 11) posed a problem. Argentina's Federal Radio and Broadcasting Committee (COMFER) forced Telefónica to sell off its Azul stake.

2002-present: Canal 9 returns
On August 20, 2002, Azul Televisión reverted to its original Canal 9 name as both the stake that Prime had sold to JP Morgan and the Telefónica stake were sold to a society headed by the journalist and media businessman Daniel Hadad. In January 2007, he sold the network to Mexican investor Remigio Ángel González under his group Albavisión Hadad first sold 80% of it and remained in charge of editorial content for the news programs, then exited the remainder of his stake.

Slogans 
 1960-1963 – Del nueve Nadie me      mueve  
 1963-1964 – Donde ponga el ojo ponga el nueve 
 1964-1974 – Lo nuevo está en el 9

 1984-1989 – Canal 9 Libertad siempre líder
 1988-1989 – Primero en audiencia primero en calidad 
 1988 – Vive tu dia  en libertad 
 1989 – Un líder que moviliza a toda la televisión Argentina 
 1991 – La fuerza de la gente 
 1992-1994 – Defendamos la vida 
 1995-1997 – El corazón de la gente 
 1997-1999 – Siempre más 
 2002 – Igual que vos
 2003 – Para vos
 2003-2004 – Bienvenido a casa
 2004-2005 – Podés entrar 
 2005-2006 – Donde vos estás 
 2006 Copa mundial 2006:– El canal de Argentina
 2007 (navidad:)  El canal de la familia 
 2009-2013 Somos vos
 2010 (Julio) - Canal 9 (50 Años) 
 2013-2014 – Compartimos todo con vos 
 2014-2015 – Crea con vos 
 2015 – Viví Canal 9 
 2016-2017 – Mi canal 
 2017 – Viviendo con vos (
 2018 (Enero-Junio) – Conectado a vos 
 2018-2019 – Un aire nuevo""
 2019 - El canal de las latas 
 2019 - El canal que vos elegís en vivo 2019-2021 - Siempre en movimiento 2021 - Sumate''

Sports events

References

External links
Official Site 
Canal 9 File

Prime Media Group
Television networks in Argentina
Television stations in Argentina
Television channels and stations established in 1960
Spanish-language television stations
Mass media in Buenos Aires
Seven Network